Camila Fabbri (born 1989) is an Argentine writer, playwright and actress.

Career
Camila Fabbri was born 1989 in Buenos Aires. She studied at the Escuela de Arte Dramático and 
her first play (Brick) won a competition in 2010. A second play, Mi primer Hiroshima was performed in 2012. Fabbri was nominated for a Silver Condor for her role in the 2014 Martín Rejtman film Two Shots Fired. She has also appeared in Verónica Chen's High Tide.

Fabbri made her debut as a writer in 2015 with the short story collection Los accidentes in 2015. Her second book was the non-fiction novel El día que apagaron la luz about the República Cromañón nightclub fire, followed by another short story anthology entitled Estamos a salvo. In 2021, she was named by Granta magazine as one of the best writers under the age of 35 in the Spanish language. Two other Argentine writers were also listed: Martín Felipe Castagnet and Michel Nieva.

References

Argentine writers
1989 births
Living people
Argentine actresses